Where Owls Know My Name is the third studio album by American death metal band Rivers of Nihil. The album was released on March 16, 2018 through Metal Blade Records and was the band's first effort to chart on the Billboard Top Sales chart, debuting at number 61 and selling 2,750 copies in its first week. It is the third album in the band's tetralogy based around the four seasons; it represents autumn.

Lyrics
In a May 2018 Reddit AMA, Uttley and Biggs stated the following regarding the album's concept and lyrical content:

Owls is essentially the story of the last man on earth. He was made immortal by the planet itself (the conscious seed of light, as it were) to be the sole intelligent witness of the death of the planet. Really though this is all set dressing for the more emotional content on display here, so looking TOO closely at the lyrics for story purposes is probably a bit of a futile effort in my opinion. It's really just about loss and getting older and coping with the things you've done in your life.

Music
The band announced they had returned to Atrium Audio, where they had recorded their Sophomore effort Monarchy in September 2017, via their Facebook page. The band once again worked with Grammy-nominated producers Carson Slovak and Grant McFarland, who had produced both their debut EP Hirearchy and their second studio album Monarchy.

The saxophone on the album is performed by Zach Strouse, from the band Burial In The Sky. Uttley met Strouse several years before the release of Owls while recording Strouse's local metal band. While tracking Strouse's guitar, Uttley learned that Strouse was a performance major on saxophone and attending school for saxophone. Uttley was impressed by Strouse's performance at a local university soon thereafter. The two remained close and Strouse agreed to track saxophone for what would become "Owls", first recording for "The Silent Life" at Uttley's home, to rave reviews from the other band members. As a result, Strouse provided 3 solos for the album and atmospheric work on two other songs. Uttley pointed out when interviewed that the band didn't want to be known as "the sax band" and that they were rather simply incorporating new elements into their sound. Uttley also noted that Strouse himself is a death metal fan, and that he was wearing an Origin shirt while recording his solos.

The song "Old Nothing" features a guest solo by former The Faceless guitarist and founding member of The Zenith Passage Justin McKinney. Andy Thomas of Black Crown Initiate provides additional vocals on the title track "Where Owls Know My Name". Sarah Thomas, sister of Andy Thomas, and girlfriend of Rivers of Nihil bassist Adam Biggs, provides additional vocals on "Subtle Change (Including the Forest of Transition and Dissatisfaction Dance)".

Artwork
Album artwork was provided by Dan Seagrave, who provided artwork for the bands' two prior releases.

Promotion
In promotion of the album the band released three singles: "The Silent Life", "A Home", and the title track. A music video for "A Home", produced by David Brodsky, was released on March 16.

The album was made available for streaming in its entirety on March 12 via WSOU.

Track listing

Personnel 
Production and performance credits are adapted from the album liner notes.

Rivers of Nihil
 Jake Dieffenbach – lead vocals
 Brody Uttley – lead guitar, acoustic guitar, keyboards, programming
 Adam Biggs – bass, backing vocals
 Jonathan Topore – rhythm guitar
 Jared Klein – drums, backing vocals

Additional musicians
 Justin McKinney – guitar solo on "Old Nothing"
 Zach Strouse – saxophone
 Grant McFarland – cello
 Sarah Thomas – vocals on "Subtle Change (Including the Forest of Transition and Dissatisfaction Dance)"
 Sean Carter – trumpet
 Andy Thomas (from Black Crown Initiate) – vocals on "Where Owls Know My Name"

Production
 Carson Slovak, Grant McFarland – producer, engineering, mixing
 Jordan Straub, Nick Shaw – additional engineering
 Alan Douches – mastering
 Dan Seagrave – artwork

References

External links
 
  Where Owls Know My Name at Metal Blade

2018 albums
Metal Blade Records albums
Rivers of Nihil albums